Palisade is an unincorporated community within the Rural Municipality of Reno No. 51, Saskatchewan, Canada. The town site (33-5-24-W3) is located 5 km north of highway 13, about 40 km west of the town of Eastend.

Education

Palisade no longer has a school, but those who live in the surrounding area are sent to the neighboring village of Consul, which has a school that covers Kindergarten to Grade 12 serving approximately 100 students.

See also 

 List of communities in Saskatchewan
 List of ghost towns in Canada
 Ghost towns in Saskatchewan

References

Reno No. 51, Saskatchewan
Unincorporated communities in Saskatchewan
Populated places established in 1910
Ghost towns in Saskatchewan
Division No. 4, Saskatchewan